Claudio Villagra (born 2 January 1996) is an Argentine footballer who plays for Deportes Temuco as a forward.

References

External links 

1996 births
Living people
Association football forwards
Argentine footballers
Argentine expatriate footballers
Argentine Primera División players
Primera Nacional players
Ascenso MX players
Primera B de Chile players
Club Atlético Banfield footballers
Atlético San Luis footballers
Sport Boys footballers
Club Atlético Temperley footballers
Deportes Temuco footballers
Argentine expatriate sportspeople in Chile
Argentine expatriate sportspeople in Mexico
Argentine expatriate sportspeople in Peru
Expatriate footballers in Chile
Expatriate footballers in Mexico
Expatriate footballers in Peru